Silhouette is a BBC Books original novel written by Justin Richards and based on the long-running British science fiction television series Doctor Who. It features the Twelfth Doctor, Clara Oswald, Madame Vastra, Jenny Flint and Strax. The book was released on 11 September 2014 along with The Blood Cell and The Crawling Terror.

Audiobook 

An unabridged audiobook version of Silhouette was released on 26 December 2014. It was read by Dan Starkey who played Strax in the series.

References

External links 
 
 

2014 British novels
2014 science fiction novels
New Series Adventures
Twelfth Doctor novels
Novels by Justin Richards
Novels set in London
Fiction set in the 1890s